This is a list of notable Tutsis

Monarchs

Kings of Rwanda
Ruganzu I ex king of Rwanda – 1438–1482
Cyirima I ex king of Rwanda – 1482–1506
Kigeli I ex king of Rwanda – 1506–1528
Mibabwe I ex king of Rwanda – 1528–1552
Yuhi I ex king of Rwanda – 1552–1576
Ndahiro II ex king of Rwanda – 1576–1600
Ruganzu II ex king of Rwanda – 1600–1624
Mutara I ex king of Rwanda – 1624–1648
Kigeli II ex king of Rwanda – 1648–1672
Mibambwe II ex king of Rwanda – 1672–1696
Yuhi II of Rwanda ex king of Rwanda – 1696–1720
Karemeera ex king of Rwanda – 1720–1744
Cyirima II ex king of Rwanda – 1744–1768
Kigeli III ex king of Rwanda – 1768–1792
Mibabwe III ex king of Rwanda – 1792–1797
Yuhi III ex king of Rwanda – 1797–1830
Mutara II ex king of Rwanda – 1830–1853
Kigeli IV ex king of Rwanda – 1853–1895
Mibambwe IV ex king of Rwanda – 1895–1896
Yuhi IV ex king of Rwanda – 1896–1931
Mutara III ex king of Rwanda – 1931 1959
Kigeli V ex king of Rwanda – 1959–1961

Queens of Rwanda
Rosalie Gicanda, queen of Rwanda

Kings of Burundi
Ntare III Rushatsi, ex king of Burundi – 1680–1709
Mwezi III Ndagushimiye, ex king of Burundi – 1709–1739
Mutaga III Senyamwiza Mutamo, ex king of Burundi – 1739–1767
Mwambutsa III Syarushambo Butama, ex king of Burundi – 1767–1796
Mwambutsa III Mbariza – 1850–1884
Ntare IV Rutaganzwa Rugamba, ex king of Burundi – 1884–1890
Mwezi IV Gisabo, ex king of Burundi – 1908–1915
Mwezi IV Gisabo, ex king of Burundi – 1915–1916
Mwezi IV Gisabo, ex king of Burundi – 1916–1922
Mutaga IV Mbikije, ex king of Burundi – 1922–1946
Mwambutsa IV Baniriceng, ex king of Burundi – 1962–1966
Ntare V Ndizeye, ex king of Burundi – 1966–1966

Politicians

National leaders

Presidents of Rwanda
Paul Kagame, currently the President of Rwanda, he previously commanded the rebel force that ended the 1994 Genocide against Tutsi in Rwanda.

Presidents of Burundi
Michel Micombero, former president of Burundi − 1940–1983
Jean-Baptiste Bagaza, former president of Burundi – born 1946
Pierre Buyoya, former president of Burundi – born 1949

Vice Presidents of Burundi
Mathias Sinamenye, 2nd vice president of Burundi
Alphonse-Marie Kadege, 4th vice president of Burundi
Frédéric Ngenzebuhoro 5th vice president of Burundi
Martin Nduwimana, 6th vice president of Burundi – born 1958

Prime Ministers of Burundi
Sylvie Kinigi, former prime minister of Burundi and acting president of Burundi – born 1952
Louis Rwagasore, former prime minister of Burundi – 1932–1961
André Muhirwa, former prime minister of Burundi-->
Léopold Biha, former prime minister of Burundi
Anatole Kanyenkiko, former prime minister of Burundi – born 1952
Antoine Nduwayo, former prime minister of Burundi – born 1942

Vice President of Democratic Republic of Congo
Azarias Ruberwa, former Vice President of the Democratic Republic of Congo – born 1964

Other politicians
James Kabarebe (born 1959), Rwandan military officer who has served as a Senior Presidential Adviser on security matters in the government of Rwanda and the Rwandan Minister of Defence.
Lando Ndasingwa, Rwandan politician, murdered in the Genocide against Tutsi in 1994
Louise Mushikiwabo, fourth and current Secretary General of Organisation internationale de la Francophonie. She previously served as the Minister of Foreign Affairs and Cooperation of Rwanda.

Athletes
 Gaël Bigirimana
 Saido Berahino
 Yannick Mukunzi

Others

Sonia Rolland, actress, mother tutsi, father French – born 1981
Stromae, Belgian musician, rapper and singer-songwriter. 
Benjamin Sehene, Rwandian author, lives in Paris – born 1959
Immaculée Ilibagiza, Rwandan American author and Rwandan Genocide survivor. 
Scholastique Mukasonga, writer, author of Our Lady of the Nile
Yolande Mukagasana (born September 6, 1954), Rwandan writer writing in French.
Ange Kagame, only daughter of Paul Kagame, current president of Rwanda.

References

 
Tutsis